Ancona railway station, sometimes called Ancona Centrale, is the main railway station of Ancona, Region of Marché (the Marches). It is the most important station of the region and is owned by the Ferrovie dello Stato (FS), Italy's state-owned railway company.

History
The station was opened on 17 November 1861 upon completion of the railway line from Bologna. The original structure, built in similar style to that of Bologna Centrale, had been heavily damaged during the Second World War and was rebuilt a few years after that.

Facilities
Ancona's station building comprises two floors; the upper floor is used by Trenitalia as railway offices. The station is located at Piazza Rosselli, in front of the docks. It hosts two small cafes, a newsagent outlet and several retail stores. An Indian restaurant across the road of Ancona station remains open till late; it is a good place to wait for late evening and overnight trains, as shops or food places in the vicinity would be closed.

The station is a principal stop on the Adriatic Railway which runs along the east coast of Italy. There is a junction for a short line to the seaport at Ancona Marittima station.

Train services
As a principal station, most long-distance trains – high-speed (Freccia, formerly branded Eurostar Italy) and Intercity (day and overnight) – call at Ancona. Additional high-speed trains operated by NTV-Italo run between Milan and Ancona during the summer months.

The following services call at this station:

High-speed
 High-speed train (Trenitalia Frecciarossa) Milan-Bari: Milan – Reggio Emilia – Bologna – Rimini – Ancona – Pescara – 
 High-speed train (Trenitalia Frecciabianca) Milan-Taranto: Milan – Piacenza – Parma – Reggio Emilia – Modena – Bologna – Rimini – Pesaro – Ancona – Giulianova – Pescara – Termoli – Foggia – Bari – Taranto 
 High-speed train (Trenitalia Frecciabianca) Milan-Lecce: Milan – Piacenza – Parma – Reggio Emilia – Modena – Bologna – Rimini – Pesaro – Senigalla – Ancona – Pescara – Termoli – Foggia – Bari – Brindisi – Lecce
 High-speed train (Trenitalia Frecciabianca) Turin-Lecce: Turin – Asti – Alessandria – Piacenza – Parma – Reggio Emilia – Modena – Bologna – Rimini – Riccione – Pesaro – Ancona – Pescara – Termoli – Foggia – Bari – Monopoli – Brindisi – Lecce
 High-speed train (Trenitalia Frecciabianca) Venice-Lecce: Venice – Padua – Rovigo – Ferrara – Bologna – Rimini – Riccione – Pesaro – Ancona – Pescara – Termoli – Foggia – Bari – Brindisi – Lecce

Intercity and Overnight
 Intercity train (Trenitalia Intercity) Ancona-Rome: Ancona – Falconara Marittima – Jesi – Fabriano – Foligno – Terni – Rome
 Intercity train (Trenitalia Intercity) Bologna-Lecce: Bologna – Faenza – Cesena – Rimini – Riccione – Pesaro – Senigalla – Ancona – Loreto – Giulianova – Pescara – Termoli – Foggia – Trani – Bisceglie – Bari – Monopoli – Brindisi – Lecce 
 Intercity train (Trenitalia Intercity) Bologna-Bari: Bologna – Faenza – Cesena – Rimini – Riccione – Pesaro – Senigalla – Ancona – Loreto – Giulianova – Pescara – Termoli – Foggia – Trani – Bisceglie – Bari 
 Intercity train (Trenitalia Intercity) Milan-Taranto: Milan – Lodi – Piacenza – Parma – Reggio Emilia – Modena – Bologna – Faenza – Cesena – Rimini – Riccione – Pesaro – Senigalla – Ancona – Giulianova – Pescara – Termoli – Foggia – Trani – Bisceglie – Bari – Taranto  
 Night train (Trenitalia Intercity Notte) Milan-Lecce: Lecce – Brindisi – Monopoli – Bari – Bisceglie – Trani – Foggia – Pescara – Ancona – Rimini – Cesena – Bologna – Milan  
 Night train (Trenitalia Intercity Notte) Milan-Lecce via Taranto: Lecce – Brindisi – Taranto – Bari – Bisceglie – Trani – Foggia – Pescara – Ancona – Rimini – Bologna – Milan

Regional

Regional train (Trenitalia Regionale) Ancona-Piacenza: Ancona – Flaconara Marittima – Senigalla – Pesaro – Riccione – Rimini – Cesena – Faenza – Imola – Bologna – Modena – Reggio Emilia – Parma – Fidenza – Piacenza
Regional train (Trenitalia Regionale) Ancona- Rome: Ancona – Falconara Marittima – Jesi – Fabriano – Foligno – Trevi – Terni – Orte – Rome
Regional train (Trenitalia Regionale) Ancona-Rimini: Ancona – Falconara Marittima – Senigalla – Fano – Pesaro – Riccione – Rimini
Regional train (Trenitalia Regionale) Ancona-Pescara: Ancona – Giulianova – Pescara
Regional train (Trenitalia Regionale) Ancona-Pesaro: Ancona – Falconara Marittima – Senigalla – Fano – Pesaro
Regional train (Trenitalia Regionale) Ancona-Ravenna: Ancona – Falconara Marittima – Senigalla – Fano – Pesaro – Riccione – Rimini – Bellaria – Classe – Ravenna
Regional train (Trenitalia Regionale) Ancona-Fabriano/Foligno: Ancona – Falconara Marittima – Jesi – Albacina – Fabriano – Foligno
Regional train (Trenitalia Regionale) Ancona-Ascoli Piceno: Ancona – Osimo Castelfidardo – Loreto – Pedaso – Grottammare – Porto d'Ascoli – Ascoli Piceno
Regional train (Trenitalia Regionale) Ancona-Macerata: Ancona – Loreto – Montecosaro – Macerata

Photo gallery

See also

 Ancona Marittima railway station
 List of railway stations in the Marche
 Railway stations in Italy
 Rail transport in Italy
 History of rail transport in Italy

Notes and references

External links

Railway stations in the Marche
Railway Station
Railway stations opened in 1861
1861 establishments in Italy
Railway stations in Italy opened in the 19th century